All In  is the seventh studio album by New Zealand singer Stan Walker, released on 19 August 2022 by Sony Music New Zealand. It was announced on 22 June 2022.

Track listing

Charts

Weekly charts

Year-end charts

References

2022 albums
Stan Walker albums
Sony Music Australia albums